{{Infobox person
| name               = Madge Sinclair
| honorific_suffix   = CD
| image              = Madge_Sinclair_1979.jpg
| caption            = Sinclair in 1979
| birth_name         = Madge Dorita Walters
| birth_date         = 
| birth_place        = Kingston, Colony of Jamaica
| death_date         = 
| death_place        = Los Angeles, California, U.S.
| years_active       = 1972–1995
| occupation         = Actress
| spouse             = 
| children           = 2
| known_for          = Leona Hamilton – Cornbread, Earl and Me Belle Reynolds – RootsQueen Aoleon – Coming to AmericaVoice of Sarabi – The Lion King 
Widow Woman – Convoy
}}
Madge Dorita Sinclair CD (née Walters; April 28, 1938 – December 20, 1995) was a Jamaican actress best known for her roles in Cornbread, Earl and Me (1975), Convoy  (1978), Coming to America (1988), Trapper John, M.D. (1980–1986), and the ABC TV miniseries Roots (1977). Sinclair also voiced the character of Sarabi, Mufasa's mate and Simba's mother, in the Disney animated feature film The Lion King (1994). A five-time Emmy Award nominee, Sinclair won the Primetime Emmy Award for Outstanding Supporting Actress – Drama Series for her role as "Empress" Josephine in Gabriel's Fire in 1991.

Early life and education
Born Madge Dorita Walters in Kingston, Jamaica, to Jamaican parents Herbert and Jemima Walters, Sinclair studied at Shortwood College for Women. After completing her studies, she worked as a teacher in Jamaica until 1966, when she left for New York to pursue her career in acting. Sinclair began acting with Joseph Papp's Public Theatre. In 1971 she portrayed Clytemnestra in the New York Shakespearean Festival production of The Wedding of Iphigenia.

Career
Sinclair made her film debut as Mrs. Scott in Conrack (1974) opposite Jon Voight; a role which earned her a nomination for the NAACP Image Award for Outstanding Actress in a Motion Picture. Her next major critical success was as Bell in the 1977 ABC mini-series Roots for which she received her first nomination for a Primetime Emmy Award.

Following Roots, she starred in the 1978 film Convoy as the Widow Woman, and she played Leona Hamilton in Cornbread, Earl and Me. Also in 1978, she co-starred in the short-lived sitcom Grandpa Goes to Washington. Sinclair went on to a long-running stint in the 1980s as nurse Ernestine Shoop on the series Trapper John, M.D. opposite Pernell Roberts. She received three Emmy nominations for her work on the show, and critic Donald Bogle praised her for "maintaining her composure and assurance no matter what the script imposed on her". In 1988, Sinclair played Queen Aoleon alongside James Earl Jones's King Jaffe Joffer in the Eddie Murphy comedy Coming to America, which reunited her on screen with her Roots husband and co-star John Amos. Later, both Sinclair and Jones would reunite as the queen and king, respectively, for the roles of Sarabi and Mufasa, Simba’s parents, in the blockbuster Disney animated film The Lion King (1994). The film became one of the best-selling titles ever on home video. It would also be her last film role. The two also collaborated on the series Gabriel's Fire, which earned Sinclair an Emmy in 1991 for Best Supporting Actress in a Dramatic Series, famously beating out the expected winner, L.A. Law Diana Muldaur.

Sinclair played the role of Lally in the 1991 Channel 4 television miniseries The Orchid House (based on Phyllis Shand Allfrey's novel of the same name), directed by Horace Ové, and also received critical praise for her supporting role in the 1992 television movie Jonathan: The Boy Nobody Wanted with JoBeth Williams. In 1993, Sinclair came to London to appear on stage at the Cochrane Theatre in The Lion, by Michael Abbensetts and directed by Horace Ové, for the Talawa Theatre Company. In 1994, she played a supporting role in the short-lived ABC-TV sitcom Me and the Boys, which starred Steve Harvey. Sinclair, in her brief role as the captain of the USS Saratoga in Star Trek IV: The Voyage Home, is commonly cited as the first female Starfleet starship captain to appear in Star Trek. Years later, Sinclair played Geordi La Forge's mother, captain of the USS Hera, in Star Trek: The Next Generation's "Interface". Her final acting role was in an episode of the sitcom Dream On'', which first aired one month before her death.

Personal life and death
Sinclair was married to Royston Sinclair, a Jamaican police officer, from 1956 until 1969 and had two sons with him. In 1982, Sinclair married actor Dean Compton, to whom she was still married at the time of her death. Sinclair died on December 20, 1995, after a 13-year battle with leukemia. Her remains were cremated and her ashes were scattered in her hometown in Jamaica. She was posthumously awarded the Order of Distinction, rank of Commander, for service in the performing arts by the prime minister of Jamaica in October, 2000.

Filmography

Film

Television films

Television series

References

Further reading

External links
 
 
 
 
 
 
 

1938 births
1995 deaths
Deaths from cancer in California
Deaths from leukemia
Outstanding Performance by a Supporting Actress in a Drama Series Primetime Emmy Award winners
Jamaican film actresses
Jamaican television actresses
African-American actresses
People from Kingston, Jamaica
Jamaican emigrants to the United States
20th-century Jamaican actresses
20th-century African-American women
20th-century African-American people
20th-century American people